TER Languedoc-Roussillon was the regional rail network serving Languedoc-Roussillon région in France. The région became the organising authority on 1 January 2002. In 2017 it was merged into the new TER Occitanie.

Network

Rail

Road
Montpellier–Saint-Affrique

Rolling stock

Multiple units
Ligne de Cerdagne
 SNCF Class Z 100
 SNCF Class Z 150
 SNCF Class Z 200
 SNCF Class Z 7300
 SNCF Class X 2200 (Also called: X 92200)
 SNCF Class X 4500
 SNCF Class X 72500
 SNCF Class X 73500

Locomotives
 SNCF Class BB 7200
 SNCF Class BB 8500
 SNCF Class BB 9300
 SNCF Class BB 9600

On order 
Twenty-five trains are on order and should be delivered 2007–2008.
21 electric 4 piece Z 27500
4 hybrid (diesel and electric) 3 piece B 81500

Kartatoo 
Kartatoo is a public transport pass system introduced during the first term of 2007. The Kartatoo card was introduced using an optional subscription system to Urban networks at a reduced price. This system is offered to TER commuters (Via pro for labourers) and allows users to purchase a monthly ticket on the Montpellier Agglomération and Nîmes Métropole networks. The scheme should be open to students (Via études) from September 2007 and to all from the end of 2008.

These new measures also come with the creation of 3 new fare zones between Montpellier and Nîmes. West to East, the three zones are centred on Montpellier (from the station Villeneuve-lès-Maguelone to that of Saint-Brès–Mudaison), Lunel (Valergues–Lunel-Vieil to Uchaud) and Nîmes (Milhaud to Manduel–Redessan).

The affected area will be extended towards the West to Agde, Béziers and Narbonne during 2008 with all inhabitants of Languedoc-Roussillon concerned from 2009.

Statistics 
1341 km of passenger lines
521 km of Double track lines
834 km of electrified lines
780 level crossings of which 23 are temporary
191 tunnels for 52 km
2322 rail bridges
28 individual lines

See also 
SNCF
Transport express régional
Réseau Ferré de France
List of SNCF stations
List of SNCF stations in Languedoc-Roussillon
Languedoc-Roussillon

References

External links 
  TER Languedoc-Roussillon official site.
  

 
TER